With newer, non-invasive imaging techniques, the origin of other, so-called adventitial sounds or heart clicks has been appreciated. These are short, high-pitched sounds.
 The mitral valve in cases of mitral stenosis may open with an opening snap on the beginning of diastole.
 Patients with mitral valve prolapse may have a mid-systolic click along with a murmur, referred to as apical late systolic murmur. Early systolic clicks may also be present in some patients.
 Aortic and pulmonary stenosis may cause an ejection click immediately after S1.

References

Symptoms and signs: Cardiac
Audible medical signs